Dan Eliyahu Ya'akov Illouz (Hebrew: דן אליהו יעקב אילוז) (born 23 February 1986) is an Israeli politician currently serving as a member of the Knesset for the Likud party since January 2023. He was previously a city councillor in Jerusalem.

Early Life and Education
Illouz was born to Moroccan Jewish parents in Montreal, Canada. He has a degree in law from McGill University, and a degree in public policy from the Hebrew University of Jerusalem. He moved to Israel from Montreal in 2009, at the age of 23.

Political Career

Illouz became a member of Hitorerut, a political party in Jerusalem, and became a member of the Jerusalem City Council in March of 2018 following the resignation of another councillor. He was subsequently elected to the council in the October 2018 municipal elections, and resigned from the council in 2021 as part of a rotation agreement with Yosef Spiezer. After resigning, Illouz served as the Israeli representative at the Zionist Organization of America.

In 2022 Illouz decided to seek election to the Knesset as a member of the Likud, participating in primaries held by the party ahead of an upcoming legislative election. In 2022, Illouz ran in the internal primary election for the Likud list of candidates for the 2022 Israeli legislative election. Illouz ran for the reserved immigrant spot on the Likud list against then-incumbent MK (and immigrant from Ethiopia) Gadi Yevarkan. Despite the fact that Yevarkan resigned from the Knesset to make himself eligible for the spot (which is reserved for newly incoming members of the Knesset), Illouz narrowly prevailed. The Likud received only 32 seats in the election, so Illouz as 33rd on the party slate did not enter the Knesset immediately. However, after the swearing-in of the thirty-seventh government of Israel, several Likud ministers resigned their seats under Israel's Norwegian law, and Illouz entered the Knesset on the 6th of January 2023.

Personal life
Illouz married Bat-El Malka, then Or Akiva's municipal architect, in 2019. He is Canadian and Israeli citizen.

References

External links

1986 births
Living people
Politicians from Montreal
McGill University alumni
Hebrew University of Jerusalem alumni
Members of the 25th Knesset (2022–)
Likud politicians
Israeli people of Moroccan-Jewish descent
Canadian people of Moroccan-Jewish descent
Israeli expatriates in France
Canadian expatriates in France